Hauturu can refer to:
 Little Barrier Island or Hauturu which is an island in the Hauraki Gulf in New Zealand
 Hauturu Island which is near Whangamatā on the Coromandel Peninsula in New Zealand
 Hauturu, Waikato a village in Otorohanga District, North Island, New Zealand